Meta Antenen (born 7 April 1949) is a retired Swiss pentathlete. Between 1969 and 1975 she won nine medals at the European championships, mostly in the long jump and hurdles. She competed at the 1968 and 1972 Olympics in four events in total and placed eighth in the pentathlon in 1968 and sixth in the long jump in 1972. Antenen was selected as the Swiss Sports Personality of the Year in 1966 and 1971. Her husband Georges Mathys is an Olympic Swiss field hockey player.

International competitions

1Did not start in the semifinals
2Did not finish in the semifinals

References

1949 births
Living people
Olympic athletes of Switzerland
Athletes (track and field) at the 1968 Summer Olympics
Athletes (track and field) at the 1972 Summer Olympics
Swiss female hurdlers
Swiss female long jumpers
Swiss pentathletes
Swiss female sprinters